Hoseynabad Rural District is a rural district (dehestan) in Esmaili District, Anbarabad County, Kerman Province, Iran. At the 2006 census, its population was 15,890, in 3,265 families. The rural district has 33 villages.

References 

Rural Districts of Kerman Province
Anbarabad County